Louise Marleau (born August 26, 1944) is a Canadian actress. She won the 1985 Genie Award for Best Performance by an Actress in a Leading Role for her role in A Woman in Transit (La Femme de l'hôtel) and was nominated in the same category in 1980 for her role in Heartbreak (L'Arrache-cœur), a role for which she won Best Actress at the 1979 Montreal World Film Festival.

Born in Montreal, she has been acting since she was a child, and she made her professional debut in 1962 at 18. Since that time she has worked with all the major theatrical companies in Canada, including the Stratford Festival, performing in works by Molière, Feydeau, Genet, Cocteau and Shakespeare.

Marleau recently translated Eve Ensler's play The Vagina Monologues into French (Canadian French).

Filmography 
 Beau temps, mauvais temps - 1955
 Fleur de l'âge, ou Les adolescentes - 1964
 YUL 871 - 1966
 Au retour des oies blanches - 1971
 In Praise of Older Women - 1978
 Heartbreak (L'Arrache-cœur) - 1979
 Contamination - 1980
 Good Riddance (Les Bons débarras) - 1980
 A Woman in Transit  (La Femme de l'hôtel) - 1984
 Anne Trister - 1986
 Exit - 1986
 Straight for the Heart (À corps perdu) - 1988
 Cruising Bar - 1989
 Le grand secret - 1989
 An Imaginary Tale (Une histoire inventée) - 1990
 The Mirage - 1992
 The Dance Goes On - 1992
 The Countess of Baton Rouge - 1998
 External Affairs - 1999
 Le Pays dans la gorge - 2000
 Canada: A People's History - 2000
 Fortier - 2001
 The Baroness and the Pig - 2002
 Bunker, le cirque - 2002

References

External links 
 

1944 births
Canadian film actresses
Canadian television actresses
Best Actress Genie and Canadian Screen Award winners
Living people
Actresses from Montreal